The following lists the events of the 1907 Philadelphia Phillies season.

Preseason 
The Phillies' 1907 spring training was held in Savannah, Georgia where the team practiced and played exhibition games at Bolton Street Park. It was the fourth successive year the Phillies trained in Savannah.

The Phillies named their team of younger players the "Minstrels" in intrasquad games against the regulars in tribute to the contemporaneous anti-Black Minstrel show, popular at the time among the Phillies’ players.

1907 Philadelphia City Series
The Phillies played four of six scheduled games against the Philadelphia Athletics for the local championship in the pre-season city series. The Phillies defeated the Athletics 4 games to 0.

The Phillies sweep moved the team to 19-18 against the A's all-time in the city series.

Regular season

Season standings

Record vs. opponents

Roster

Player stats

Batting

Starters by position 
Note: Pos = Position; G = Games played; AB = At bats; H = Hits; Avg. = Batting average; HR = Home runs; RBI = Runs batted in

Other batters 
Note: G = Games played; AB = At bats; H = Hits; Avg. = Batting average; HR = Home runs; RBI = Runs batted in

Pitching

Starting pitchers 
Note: G = Games pitched; IP = Innings pitched; W = Wins; L = Losses; ERA = Earned run average; SO = Strikeouts

Other pitchers 
Note: G = Games pitched; IP = Innings pitched; W = Wins; L = Losses; ERA = Earned run average; SO = Strikeouts

Relief pitchers 
Note: G = Games pitched; W = Wins; L = Losses; SV = Saves; ERA = Earned run average; SO = Strikeouts

References 

1907 Philadelphia Phillies season at Baseball Reference

Philadelphia Phillies seasons
Philadelphia Phillies season
Philly